Anthony J. DeLuca (born July 25, 1970) is a member of the Illinois House of Representatives who has represented the 80th district since his appointment in March 2009 to succeed George Scully, who was appointed to the Illinois Circuit Court of Cook County. The Southland based district includes all or parts of Homewood, Flossmoor, Chicago Heights, Park Forest, South Chicago Heights, University Park, Frankfort, Manhattan and Olympia Fields, Manhattan, Frankfort, Mokena, New Lenox, Glenwood, Symerton, Illinois.

Before being appointed to that position, he served as mayor of Chicago Heights, Illinois, since 2003. Some controversy was created as DeLuca is known to many to be a member of the Republican Party, whereas Scully is a Democrat. DeLuca has stated, "If I am appointed to a Democratic seat, I am a Democrat."

As of July 3, 2022, Representative DeLuca is a member of the following Illinois House committees:

 (Chairman of) Cities & Villages Committee (HCIV)
 Cybersecurity, Data Analytics, & IT Committee (HCDA)
 Insurance Committee (HINS)
 (Co-chairman of) Insurance Review Subcommittee (HINS-INSU)
 (Chairman of) Local Government Subcommittee (HCIV-LOCA)
 Prescription Drug Affordability Committee (HPDA)

References

External links
Representative Anthony DeLuca (D) 80th District at the Illinois General Assembly
By session: 98th, 97th, 96th
State Representative Anthony DeLuca constituency site
 
Rep. Anthony DeLuca at Illinois House Democrats

Democratic Party members of the Illinois House of Representatives
Living people
1970 births
Elmhurst College alumni
21st-century American politicians
Mayors of places in Illinois
People from Chicago Heights, Illinois